Mohd Fariss Azlan Mat Isa (born 6 August 1984) is a Malaysian footballer who currently plays as a defender for Kuala Lumpur United.

Career
He started his professional career at Kelantan based club TNB Kelantan FC in 2004, after spending 3 years in the youth setup of Perlis FA. During his time with Perlis FA, he also participated in 2002 SUKMA Games football competition playing for state of Perlis.

After TNB Kelantan pulled out of the league in 2006, he returned to his home state Kedah to join Gurun based club Kuala Muda NAZA FC. With NAZA FC, he won the Malaysia Premier League 2007-08 championship.

He played for Sabah in the 2009 season, making his debut for Sabah in the match against Sinar Dimaja Mai Sarah FC which Sabah won 2–0. A year later, he switched club to the newly promoted to 2010 Malaysia Premier League team USM FC.

He signed a new contract with Sabah FA for 2012 season as a regular player, after joining them for the 2011 Malaysia Cup campaign on loan from USM FC. He joined Perak FA on loan for the 2012 Malaysia Cup competition, as Sabah failed to qualify for the competition. He also suffered relegation with Sabah in the same season.

He returned home once more in 2013, this time to join Kedah FA. In November 2014, he moved to Kuala Lumpur United

References

External links 
 SUKMA 2002 – Profil Atlit 
 

Malaysian footballers
Living people
1984 births
Malaysian people of Malay descent
Kuala Muda Naza F.C. players
Sabah F.C. (Malaysia) players
Perak F.C. players
Kedah Darul Aman F.C. players
People from Kedah
Association football defenders